Peter Velhorn (24 November 1932 – 20 July 2016) was a German footballer and manager.

External links
 

1932 births
2016 deaths
German footballers
Association football forwards
German football managers
FC Bayern Munich footballers
Rot-Weiss Essen players
FC Kärnten players
FC Wacker Innsbruck managers
First Vienna FC managers
FC Bayern Munich II players
Footballers from Munich